Langbaurgh may refer to 

Langbaurgh, North Yorkshire, a hamlet near Great Ayton, North Yorkshire, England
Langbaurgh (district), a local government district in Cleveland, England from 1974 to 1988, renamed Langbaurgh-on-Tees from 1988 to 1996
Langbaurgh Wapentake, a historic subdivision of the North Riding of Yorkshire, England
Langbaurgh East
Langbaurgh West
Langbaurgh (UK Parliament constituency), from 1983 to 1997

See also 
Langbaurgh Ridge